Samuel Yaw (born 2 February 1945) is a Ghanaian footballer. He competed in the men's tournament at the 1972 Summer Olympics.

References

External links
 

1945 births
Living people
Ghanaian footballers
Ghana international footballers
Olympic footballers of Ghana
Footballers at the 1972 Summer Olympics
Place of birth missing (living people)
Association football midfielders
Asante Kotoko S.C. players